They Meet Again is a 1941 American film directed by Erle C. Kenton and starring Jean Hersholt, Dorothy Lovett, and Robert Baldwin. It is one of the six films in the Dr. Christian series.

Plot
Dr. Paul Christian is giving a party for Janie Webster, a motherless little girl of nine, with a fine singing voice. But, as her father, Bob Webster, is about to leave the bank where he works to go to the celebration, a shortage is found in his books. for which he is held responsible, jailed, and subsequently, in a court trial is found guilty.

Cast 
Jean Hersholt as Dr. Paul Christian
Dorothy Lovett as Judy Price
Maude Eburne as Mrs. Hastings
Neil Hamilton as Governor John C. North
Anne Bennett as Janie Webster
Barton Yarborough as Bob Webster
Arthur Hoyt as Redmond, Governor's Secretary
John Dilson as William Merrill Sr.
Frank Melton as William Merrill Jr.
Leon Tyler as Dick
Milton Kibbee as Defense Attorney Larkin
Gus Glassmire as Judge Ed Ellis
Patsy Parsons as Susie
Meredith Howard as Gertrude

Soundtrack 
Anne Bennett - "When Love Is New" (Lyrics by Jack Owens, music by Claude Sweeten)
Anne Bennett - "In the Make Believe Land of Dreams" (Written by Jack Owens)
Patsy Parsons - "Get Alive" (Written by Jack Owens)
Leon Tyler - "The Rhythm Is Red an' White an' Blue" (Lyrics by David Gregory, music by Al Moss)
Anne Bennett - "Au Forse E Lut" (aria from La Traviata) (Written by Giuseppe Verdi)

References

External links 

1941 films
American black-and-white films
1941 musical films
Films set in Chicago
American musical films
1940s English-language films
1940s American films
Dr. Christian films